Actinopteryx is a genus of beetles belonging to the family Ptiliidae which is sometimes referred to as feather-winged beetles as the hindwings are narrow and feather-like.

External links

 Taxon: Genus Actinopteryx Matthews, the Taxonomicon.

Ptiliidae